The 1989–90 Yorkshire Cup was the eighty-second occasion on which the Yorkshire Cup competition was held. Bradford Northern won the trophy for the  second time in three years, this time by beating Featherstone Rovers by the score of 20-14
The match was played at Headingley, Leeds, now in West Yorkshire. The attendance was 12,607 and receipts were £50,775
For the first time, both semi-final matches resulted in draws, both requiring a replay.

Background 
This season there were no junior/amateur clubs taking part, no new entrants and no "leavers" and so the total of entries remained the  same at eighteen.
This in turn resulted in the necessity to continue with a preliminary round to reduce the  number of clubs entering the first round to sixteen.

Competition and results

Preliminary round 

Involved 2 matches and 4 clubs

Round 1 
Involved  5 matches (with three byes) and 13 clubs

Round 2 - Quarter-finals 
Involved 4 matches and 8 clubs

Round 3 – Semi-finals  
Involved 2 matches and 4 clubs

Semi-final - replays  
Involved  1 match and 2 clubs

Final

Teams and scorers 

Scoring - Try = four points - Goal = two points - Drop goal = one point

The road to success 
The  following chart excludes any preliminary round fixtures/results

Notes and comments 
1 * The  second highest score in a Yorkshire Cup match to date
2 * Headingley, Leeds, is the home ground of Leeds RLFC with a capacity of 21,000. The record attendance was  40,175 for a league match between Leeds and Bradford Northern on 21 May 1947.

General information for those unfamiliar 
The Rugby League Yorkshire Cup competition was a knock-out competition between (mainly professional) rugby league clubs from  the  county of Yorkshire. The actual area was at times increased to encompass other teams from  outside the  county such as Newcastle, Mansfield, Coventry, and even London (in the form of Acton & Willesden).
The Rugby League season always (until the onset of "Summer Rugby" in 1996) ran from around August-time through to around May-time and this competition always took place early in the season, in the Autumn, with the final taking place in (or just before) December (The only exception to this was when disruption of the fixture list was caused during, and immediately after, the two World Wars)

See also 
1989–90 Rugby Football League season
Rugby league county cups

References

External links
Saints Heritage Society
1896–97 Northern Rugby Football Union season at wigan.rlfans.com 
Hull&Proud Fixtures & Results 1896/1897
Widnes Vikings - One team, one passion Season In Review - 1896–97
The Northern Union at warringtonwolves.org

RFL Yorkshire Cup
Yorkshire Cup